Garaud is a French surname. Notable people with the surname include:

Hector Garaud (1897–1940), French World War I flying ace
Hélène Garaud, French film actor from the 1940s
Marie-France Garaud (born 1934), French politician
Pascale Garaud, French-American astrophysicist

French-language surnames